This article lists the speakers of the National Assembly of the Republika Srpska.

Speakers of the National Assembly of Republika Srpska (1991–present)

Timeline

See also
President of Republika Srpska
List of presidents of Republika Srpska
List of vice presidents of Republika Srpska
List of prime ministers of Republika Srpska

Standard

References

External links
Political Leaders: Bosnia and Hercegovina

Speakers of the National Assembly
Republika Srpska
Speakers of the National Assembly of Republika Srpska